Saifullah Lake also known as Saifullah Danda in Pashto is an alpine glacial lake located to the north of Kalam Valley in Swat District of Khyber Pakhtunkhwa province of Pakistan.
From Mahodand Lake, you can trek to Saifullah Lake or also access the lake through 4×4 vehicles. The trek to Saifullah Lake is just about 10–15 minutes.

See also
Katora Lake - Kumrat Valley
Saidgai Lake - Swat Valley
Mahodand Lake - Kalam Valley
Kundol Lake - Kalam Valley
Daral Lake - Swat Valley
Lake Saiful Muluk - Kaghan Valley
List of Tourist attractions in Swat - List of tourist attractions in Swat

References

External links 
 سیف اللہ جھیل

Tourist attractions in Swat
Lakes of Khyber Pakhtunkhwa
Swat District